Isaq, also known as Mohamad Issack is an Indian film producer and director of Kollywood. His debut film was Agadam, made in the Tamil language. Agadam also claims to be the first film to be shot using night effects with a hand-held camera. Issack successfully remade the same film in Telugu as Seesa with actor Sivaji in lead role.

Issack is now filming Nagesh Thiraiyarangam starring Aari, Ashna Zaveri, 70's heroine Latha and senior actress Sithara.

Filmography

References

External links
 

Living people
1978 births
Tamil film directors
Telugu film directors
Film directors from Chennai
Film producers from Chennai
Screenwriters from Tamil Nadu
21st-century Indian film directors